Thomas Lot Mason (23 November 1886 – 1954) was an English professional footballer who played for Tottenham Hotspur, Southend United and Sittingbourne.

Football career 
Mason began his career at Tottenham Hotspur and competed in seven matches and scoring once between 1911–12. The inside right went on to play for Southend United and finally Sittingbourne.

References 

1886 births
1954 deaths
Footballers from Portsmouth
English footballers
English Football League players
Tottenham Hotspur F.C. players
Southend United F.C. players
Sittingbourne F.C. players
Association football inside forwards